The Pakistan Navy School of Logistics and  Management (L&M) is a public staff college located at the vicinity of the National University of Sciences and Technology (NUST) in Karachi, Sindh, Pakistan. The staff college operated by the Pakistan Navy
and focuses towards providing the education, training, and grants degrees in military logistics, political science, management, and administration.

The School of Logistics and Management (L&M) serves the similar task with the curriculum provided by the Pakistan Command and Staff College in Quetta and the Institute of Aviation Technology

Academic structure

PN School of Logistics and Management is committed to produce logisticians in order to contribute towards the combat readiness of the Pakistan Navy. Prominent infrastructure available with the School is highlighted below:

 Administration Block
 Residential Blocks
 Computer Labs and Internet Facilities
 Trained Faculty
Library having huge collection of Books
 Audio/Visual Training Aids/Typing Pool
 Training Simulators (for Chefs & Stewards)
 Boarding and Lodging Facilities.
 Training Ward Room and Training Galley.

History

The School of Logistics and Management started its function under Vice-Admiral Patrick J. Simpson near at the Manora Island of Karachi. In August 1970, the Pakistan Navy and Pakistan Government approved the federal university status of the school, therefore it was shifted to under the command of Karsaz Naval Technical Base. In 1987 the school went under major modernization, providing a well-equipped Galley, Bakery, Simulator Ward Room, Audio/Visual Typing system and a Computer Lab to enhance the training capabilities. On 14 August 1995 the School was made an independent unit, responsible to Commander Karachi for its assigned mission.

Status

The School is functioning independently since 14 August 1995 and is responsible to Commander Karachi for its assigned mission. The Command structure has been upgraded form “Officer In-charge” to “Commanding Officer”. The School imparts training on Logistics, Inventory and Financial Management to PN Officers, Allied Officers, PN CPOs, Sailors, Allied CPOs/Sailors and All PN Civilian employees.

See also
 Institute of Business Administration, Karachi

External links
 PN School of Logistics & Management - Official site
 Institute of Business Administration, Karachi - Official site

Universities and colleges in Karachi
Military logistics of Pakistan
Maritime colleges in Pakistan